Pardosa baehrorum is a wolf spider species in the genus Pardosa found in Germany, Switzerland, and Austria.

See also 
 List of Lycosidae species

References

External links 

baehrorum
Spiders of Europe
Spiders described in 1999